BMC Ecology and Evolution (since January 2021), previously BMC Evolutionary Biology (2001–2020), is a peer-reviewed open access scientific journal covering all fields of evolutionary biology, including phylogenetics and palaeontology. It was established in 2001 and is part of a series of BMC journals published by BioMed Central.

Abstracting and indexing 
The journal is abstracted and indexed in:

According to the Journal Citation Reports, the journal has a 2020 impact factor of 3.260.

References

External links 
 

BioMed Central academic journals
Creative Commons Attribution-licensed journals